"On s'est aimé à cause" (meaning "We've Loved Each Other Because") is the third and last single released in Quebec from Celine Dion's French-language album D'elles. It was sent to radio stations in August 2007.

Background and release
The lyrics were written by Françoise Dorin (author of "Et s'il n'en restait qu'une (je serais celle-là)") and music by Marc Dupré and Jean-François Breau. Tino Izzo produced the track. Dion worked with Izzo already on "Plus haut que moi" in 1993 and "Tout près du bonheur" in 2005 (which she recorded as a duet with Dupré, who also co-wrote this song). Later, Izzo wrote also "A World to Believe In" for the Taking Chances album. Dion performed "On s'est aimé à cause" during the Quebecer TVA TV special dedicated to the issue of her album D'elles. There was no music video made for this track.

Charts

A cause

D'elles also includes another version of "On s'est aimé à cause," called "A cause" (meaning "Because"). It was recorded with music by Jacques Veneruso ("Sous le vent," "Tout l'or des hommes" and "Je ne vous oublie pas"), who also produced the track. The lyrics were modified to fit the danceable arrangement. "A cause" was supposed to be released as a radio single in France in January 2008. At the same time "Alone" was released to promote Dion's English album Taking Chances. Both tracks were included on the "A cause" promotional single.

Dion performed "A cause" during the French TF1 TV special dedicated to the issue of her album D'elles, in May 2007. She also performed it on Vivement Dimanche during her visit in France, in November 2007. The performance was supposed to be broadcast on France 2 in May 2008, during the French leg of the Taking Chances World Tour, but it was cancelled. "A cause" was remixed by Dj Rien - French producer, composer and remixer. There was no music video made for this track. Stephen Thomas Erlewine of AllMusic highlighted this song.

Track listing and formats
 French promotional CD single
 "A cause" (Album Version) – 3:14
 "A cause" (Remix Radio Edit) – 3:14
 "Alone" – 3:23

Remixes
 "A cause" (Remix Radio Edit) – 3:14
 "A cause" (Remix) – 3:41

References

Celine Dion songs
2007 singles
French-language songs
Songs written by Marc Dupré
Songs written by Françoise Dorin
Songs written by Jacques Veneruso
2007 songs
Columbia Records singles
Epic Records singles